Yaadava Kannan Temple, Thanjavur, is a Vishnu temple in (also known as Karanthai), a suburb of Thanjavur in Thanjavur district in Tamil Nadu (India).

Structure
The temple was built during the period of Pratap Singh during 1755 A.D., The temple has raja gopura, garbhagriha, inner prakara, vimana  and front mandapa.
.

Presiding deity
The Presiding deity Shri Venugopalasamy is found with Bama and Rukmini. The processional deity, Yaadava Kannan, is in dancing posture. In the inner prakara, Tirupati Balaji is found in standing posture.

Festivals
Shri Krishna Jayanti and Navaneeta Sevai ( offering of Milk cream known as Navaneeta in Samskrta language to God Krishna ) are important festivals of the temple. Shri Krishna Jayanti is celebrated 11 days.
During the Navaneeta Sevai, the processional deity of this temple would go around the town along with other deities of God Vishnu temples and bless the people.

Kumbhabhishekham
The Kumbhabhishekham of the temple was held on 2 July 2018.

Other temples
Bhooloka Shri Krishnan Temple and Vitthoba Temple are other Kannan temples found in Thanjavur.

References

Photogallery

Hindu temples in Thanjavur
Vishnu temples